Jazz Pharmaceuticals plc (a merger of Jazz Pharmaceuticals, Inc. and Azur Pharma plc) is a biopharmaceutical company based in Ireland. It was founded in 2003. One of the company's considerable products is the United States Food and Drug Administration (FDA) approved drug Xyrem (sodium oxybate), the sodium salt of the naturally occurring neurotransmitter γ-Hydroxybutyric acid (GHB). In 2017, net product sales of Xyrem were $1.187 billion, which represented 74% of the company's total net product sales. In 2019, Jazz was granted FDA-approval to market Sunosi with indications for treating excessive daytime sleepiness (EDS) in narcolepsy as well as obstructive sleep apnea (OSA). In 2022, it was announced that Axsome Therapeutics would be acquiring Sunosi from Jazz Pharmaceuticals

In 2007, the company pled guilty to felony charges related to its illegal marketing of Xyrem for off-label use.

The company is also a member of the Pharmaceutical Research and Manufacturers of America (PhRMA).

Company history and acquisitions

2010–2019
On 18 February 2010, the FDA accepted a new drug application for JZP-6 (Sodium oxybate) for the treatment of Fibromyalgia. In the following December, a new patent was issued for Sodium Oxybate.

On September 19, 2011, Jazz Pharmaceuticals merged with Irish Azur Pharma plc to form Jazz Pharmaceuticals plc. The Azur Pharma seat in Dublin became the headquarters of the combined company. Azur Pharma had been marketing specialty pharmaceutical products in the central nervous system (CNS) and women's health areas with US operations in Philadelphia.

On 26 April 2012, the company acquired EUSA Pharma for $650 million (plus $50 million in milestone payments). In September, the company sold its Women's Health business to Meda for $95 million. In December, the company began clinical trial of intravenous Erwinaze in patients with Acute Lymphoblastic Leukemia.

In January 2014, the company announced it would acquire the rare disease drug developer Gentium SpA and its lead product Defitelio for $1 billion.

In May 2016, the company announced it would acquire Alizé Pharma II for $20.5 million. At the end of the same month, the company announced its largest acquisition to date, with the purchase of Celator Pharmaceuticals for $1.5 billion. As a result, Jazz obtained the rights to breakthrough therapy Vyxeos (liposomal daunorubicin and cytarabine) for treatment of acute myeloid leukemia.

In August 2019, the company announced it would acquire Cavion Inc. for up to ~$310 million.

2020–onwards
In January 2021, Jazz announced it would acquire GW Pharmaceuticals for $7.2 billion ($200.00 in cash and $20.00 in shares of Jazz).

Acquisition history
The following is an illustration of the company's mergers, acquisitions, spin-offs and historical predecessors:

Jazz Pharmaceuticals
Jazz Pharmaceuticals PLC
Jazz Pharmaceuticals, Inc. (Merged 2011)
Azur Pharma PLC (Merged 2011)
EUSA Pharma (Acq 2012)
Gentium SpA (Acq 2014)
Alizé Pharma II (Acq 2016)
Celator Pharmaceuticals (Acq 2016)
Cavion Inc. (Acq 2019)
GW Pharmaceuticals (Acq 2021)

References

Biopharmaceutical companies
Biotechnology companies of Ireland
Biotechnology companies established in 2003
Pharmaceutical companies established in 2003
Pharmaceutical companies of Ireland
Irish companies established in 2003
Manufacturing companies based in Dublin (city)
Tax inversions
Companies listed on the Nasdaq